The Home Team Science and Technology Agency (HTX) is a statutory board under the Ministry of Home Affairs of Singapore to develop science and technology capabilities for Home Team operations.

History 
The Home Team Science and Technology Agency (HTX) was first announced on 19 February 2019 during the Budget, which was to be set up by the end of 2019. That will allow the Ministry of Home Affairs to better secure Singapore with its science and technology capabilities. The initials of the agency are known as HTX; with "X" representing its role as a "force multiplier".

The HTX was formed on 1 December 2019 and launched the following day by Prime Minister Lee Hsien Loong, with HTX showcasing its new technologies.

Overview 
The agency's mission is to "amplify, augment, and accelerate the Home Team’s advantage to secure Singapore’s future as the safest place on planet earth". It would focus on areas such as surveillance, forensics, chemicals, biological, radiological, nuclear, and explosives threats, as well as robotics and unmanned systems.

See also 

 Ministry of Home Affairs (Singapore)
 Home Team Academy

References

External links 

 

Statutory boards of the Singapore Government
2019 establishments in Singapore
Government agencies established in 2019
Organizations established in 2019